Camille Joann Natta (born 19 November 1977) is a French actress.

Education
She graduated from St Peter's College, Oxford with an M.A. in Politics, Philosophy, and Economics.

Filmography

References

External links 
 Camille Natta official site

Living people
Alumni of St Peter's College, Oxford
1977 births
French film actresses